Girl to Girl is the third studio album by Canadian country music artist Tenille Arts. It was released on October 11, 2021 via 19th & Grand Records and Empire Distribution, and includes the singles "Give It to Me Straight", "Back Then, Right Now", and "Girl to the Girl". Arts co-wrote every song on the album.

Background
Arts experienced unexpected time away from touring amidst the COVID-19 pandemic and began reflecting on her teenage years. She began writing songs that she "[wished she] had back then," perceiving the album as a letter to her "current and younger self." Arts stated that if one listened to the album in order from "Back Then, Right Now" to "Growing Old Young," they would be listening to her "life from right now to back then," while reversing the order would be a "chronological order" of how she "got to where [she] is today." She added that she wanted to write "like a big sister," sharing her experiences "in hopes that people would feel less alone."

Critical reception
Nicole Piering of Country Swag reviewed the song favourably, stating that Arts "deftly embraces the relatability and country hooks that have made superstars out of the likes of Taylor Swift and Kelsea Ballerini." She added that the "authentic songwriting" puts her "in a league others rarely play in." Jacques Wang of The Insider stated that in comparison to Arts' previous two albums, Girl to Girl "adds an extra charm by sharing listeners a taste of personal life lessons. He recommended the album for "fans of modern contemporary country music and those who wish to experience the vast world of country music for the first time." Lesley Janes of The Nash News spoke positively of the album, saying that that Arts  "bears her heart with every song, keeping her younger fans in mind as well as her peers." Imogen Marshall of Off the Record stated that while there was not "a huge amount of [sonic] variety" on the album, it was still a "delightfully charming album that will no doubt elevate Arts' career," due to the "tenderness with which she crafts her letter to her younger self."

Track listing

Charts

Singles

Awards and nominations

Release history

References

2021 albums
Tenille Arts albums